Jaakola is a Finnish surname. Notable people with the name include:

Alpo Jaakola (1929–1997), Finnish painter and sculptor
Jorma Jaakola (born 1950), Finnish athlete in javelin throw
Topi Jaakola (born 1983), Finnish ice hockey player

Finnish-language surnames